The Executions of Kokkinia took place on the August 17, 1944, and was the largest Nazi roundup and one of the largest-scale war crimes perpetrated during the German occupation of Greece. The operation was carried out by members of the Luftwaffe and collaborationist Security Battalions, and involved the execution of hundreds of civilians (mostly partisans), thousands of hostages being sent to concentration camps, and the burning down of entire house blocks, as well as significant atrocities. The massacre was partly in retaliation for the Germans' defeat in Battle of Kokkinia five months before, on 4-8 March 1944. The leaders and members of the Security Battalions involved in the killings were never convicted by the Greek state.

See also
List of massacres in Greece

Books

External links

References 

Nazi war crimes in Greece
Mass murder in 1944
1944 in Greece
August 1944 events
Massacres in 1944
Massacres in Greece during World War II
Athens in World War II